Elon University School of Law is an American law school located in Greensboro, North Carolina, occupying the former downtown public library building. Established in 2006, Elon Law is one of nine graduate programs offered by Elon University. It earned full accreditation from the American Bar Association in 2011.

History
In October 2004 Elon University trustees voted to start a law school in the former Greensboro Central Public Library at West Friendly Avenue and North Greene Street. Former Greensboro mayor and Joseph M. Bryan Foundation president Jim Melvin led the effort to raise $10 million over a period of eight months. The Bryan Foundation bought the building from the city and planned to lease it to the school for $1 a year, with the school owning the building after ten years. Leary "Leary the Theory" Davis became the first dean of the law school, having served as the first dean of Campbell University's Norman Adrian Wiggins School of Law.

In Spring 2005, renovation work began on the 84,000-square-foot $6 million facility, with plans for a $2.5 million library, a courtroom, and study areas. The first students were expected in Fall 2006. On June 29, 2006, donors, trustees and faculty toured the H. Michael Weaver Building. The ceremony included unveiling of a portrait of Weaver, chairman of Weaver Investment Company and the Weaver Foundation.

W.S. Supreme Court Justice Sandra Day O'Connor dedicated the new law school September 19, 2006. 115 students were enrolled.

The American Bar Association granted provisional accreditation in 2008 to Elon Law School. Full accreditation followed in 2010.

Also in 2008, Leary announced he would no longer be dean due to health problems, but he intended to remain as a professor. George R. Johnson Jr. replaced him after serving as interim dean.

In 2011, Elon announced plans for buying land in Greensboro to expand the law school, which had 132 students.

Starting in Fall 2015, Elon students attended for two and a half years rather than the usual three, using a trimester schedule. Elon was believed to be the first law school in the United States to do this. Also, Elon began a joint program with Guilford College. Another program introduced in March 2016 allows students to attend N.C. A&T for three years and Elon for two and a half years. Both programs would give students a Bachelor's degree from the other school and a law degree from Elon.

Academic programs and clinics

2.5 year program 
In December 2017, Elon Law graduated its first class to complete a seven-trimester, 2.5-year program that requires each student to work during part of his or her second year in a full-time legal residency-in-practice with a law firm, judge, government agency, corporation or nonprofit.

Dual-degree programs
Elon Law students can apply after their first year to one of two dual-degree programs offered at the school: a JD/MBA program with Elon University's Martha and Spencer Love School of Business, or a JD/Master of Environmental Law & Policy in coordination with Vermont Law School. In the JD/MBA program, students take courses at both the law school’s downtown Greensboro campus and at the Ernest A. Koury Sr. Business Center located on Elon University's main campus in Elon, N.C. Completing the requirements of both programs can be accomplished in as little as three years.

In the JD/MELP program, students complete courses at Elon Law and live in Vermont during their second summer to work in Vermont Law's Environmental and Natural Resources Law Clinic. Those in the program typically complete requirements for both degrees in 2.5-years.

Elon Law Leadership Fellows
Elon Law's competitive Leadership Fellows program recruits students who demonstrate exceptional leadership in all aspects of life, in addition to academic excellence. Candidates for the Leadership Fellows program complete a separate application during the admissions process, though a limited number of enrolled students are accepted into the program following their first year. Leadership Fellows complete summer externships that allows them the opportunity to serve within the public sector while also earning course credit. Fellows are required to maintain a minimum cumulative GPA, assist administration and faculty with leadership programming such as the Distinguished Leadership Lecture Series, and complete a Capstone project.

Elon Law Business Fellows
Elon Law's Business Fellows take part in a summer externship in a corporate or business setting, such as an in-house legal department; receive a stipend covering the tuition cost and living expenses for the summer corporate or business externship, as well as a Business Fellows Scholarship toward tuition during the academic year; and an opportunity to counsel businesses through the law school's Small Business & Entrepreneurship Clinic. Students meet professionals within the fields of business and business law at regional and national levels.

Clinical law center and the Humanitarian Immigration Law Clinic

Elon Law opened its Clinical Law Center in 2009 to support legal services provided by law school students. The center provides a facility for students, under the supervision of law faculty and attorneys, to work with clients referred by nonprofit organizations and government agencies in the greater-Greensboro region. The center currently houses the law school's Humanitarian Immigration Law Clinic, which has provided assistance to hundreds of refugees and clients seeking asylum or family reunification since opening in 2010.

North Carolina business court

The Elon University School of Law houses the North Carolina Business Court. The court hears cases involving complex commercial and corporate law disputes in the law school's Robert E. Long Courtroom. The courtroom includes three large flat screen monitors to display motions, briefs and other documents, wireless technology and videoconferencing capabilities. All Business Court cases are assigned by the Chief Justice of the North Carolina Supreme Court. Judge James Gale presides over cases heard in Greensboro, and the court also has judges and holds hearings in Raleigh, North Carolina, and Charlotte, North Carolina.

Leadership 
Elon Law is led by interim dean and associate professor of law Alan Woodlief, who assumed his position on January 1, 2022, as Elon University conducts a national search for its fourth dean. He was preceded by professor of law Luke Bierman, dean emeritus George Johnson, and founding dean Leary Davis. David Gergen chairs the Elon University School of Law Advisory Board.

Admissions and rankings 
For the 2021 entering class the 50th Percentile LSAT score was 152 and GPA was 3.31.

U.S. News & World Report ranked Elon Law 147-193 (bottom 25%) in its 2021 ranking of the best US law schools.

Elon Law was ranked #7 with a grade of A+ in preLaw Magazine's 2020 annual guide to "Best Schools for Practical Training."

Employment and bar passage 
82% of Elon Law graduates who took the North Carolina Bar Exam for the first time in February 2021 passed, vs. a total pass rate in North Carolina of 80%.

Elon Law reported that 73% of 2020 graduates had obtained full-time long-term bar passage-required employment in the ABA's most recent employment summary report. The overall employment rate for 2020 graduates was  employment rate was 88%.

Costs
The total cost of attendance (indicating the cost of tuition, fees, and living expenses) at Elon for the 2021-2022 academic year for 1L students is $83,956. The Law School Transparency estimated debt-financed cost of attendance for three years is $221,372.

Student organizations 
 American Civil Liberties Union
 Amnesty International
 Black Law Students Association
 Criminal Law Society
 Delta Theta Phi
 Elon Law Democrats
 Elon Law Moot Court
 Elon Law Pro Bono Board
 Elon Law Republicans
 Elon Law Review
 Elon Law Student Bar Association
 Family Law Society Federalist Society
 Innocence Project
 Hispanic and Latinx Law Students Association
 Intellectual Property Student Organization
 International Law Society
 Intervarsity Christian Fellowship
 Jewish Law Students Association
 Military Law Society
 OutLaw
 Phi Alpha Delta
 Public Interest Law Society
 Women's Law Association

Notable advisory board and faculty members 
 Rhoda Bryan Billings - Chief Justice of the Supreme Court of North Carolina (1986)
 James G. Exum - Distinguished Jurist in Residence at Elon Law; Chief Justice of the Supreme Court of North Carolina (1986–1995)
 Henry Frye - Chief Justice of the Supreme Court of North Carolina (1999–2001)
 David Gergen - Chair of the Advisory Board; Former Adviser to Four U.S. presidents

Melvin photo controversy
In Summer 2020, a portrait of former Greensboro mayor Jim Melvin, who played a major role in bringing the law school to Greensboro, was moved to a less visible area on the campus during remodeling. Students had requested the removal of the portrait because of comments Melvin made in a 2015 interview. Melvin told the News and Record he did not like the use of the term "massacre" for the 1979 Greensboro massacre. He also said that the Communist Workers' Party, in that confrontation, "picked a fight" with the Klan and Nazis, but "they never intended on getting killed." Students representing a group seeking changes intended to make the law school more inclusive found the suggestion that the Klan was provoked to be offensive. They sought removal of "any paintings and photographs of historical perpetrators of social injustice and racial inequity currently present at Elon Law." When the portrait was moved, the students indicated that they would continue efforts to have the portrait removed from campus.

References

External links
 

Law schools in North Carolina
Educational institutions established in 2006
Elon University
Universities and colleges in Greensboro, North Carolina
2006 establishments in North Carolina